"Way of the World" is a song recorded by Australian band Max Q and released in August 1989 as the band's debut and lead single from their debut self-titled album (1989). 

At the ARIA Music Awards of 1990, the song was nominated for two awards; ARIA Single of the Year and Breakthrough Artist – Single.

Track listing
7"
 "Way of the World" – 4:08
 "Zero 2 0"  (Todd Terry mix) – 4:20

12"/CD Maxi
 "Way of the World"  (12" Mix)  – 4:37	
 "Way of the World"  (7" Mix)  – 4:08	
 "Zero 2 0"  (Todd Terry mix) – 4:20
 "Ghost of the Year   (Todd Terry mix) – 4:23

Charts

Weekly charts

Year-end charts

Release history

References

1989 songs
1989 debut singles
Max Q (Australian band) songs
Song recordings produced by Michael Hutchence
Song recordings produced by Ollie Olsen
CBS Records singles
Songs written by Ollie Olsen